Randall Airport  is a public use airport in Orange County, New York, United States. It is owned by Aerodrome Dev Corp and is located two nautical miles (3.74 km) southeast of the central business district of the City of Middletown. According to the FAA's National Plan of Integrated Airport Systems for 2007-2011, it is categorized as a reliever airport.

Although most U.S. airports use the same three-letter location identifier for the FAA and IATA, this airport is assigned 06N by the FAA but has no designation from the IATA.

Facilities and aircraft 

For the 12-month period ending August 6, 2006, the airport had 22,504 aircraft operations, an average of 27 per day: 100% general aviation with a few ultralights. At that time there were 43 aircraft based at this airport: 47% single-engine, 44% gliders and 9% ultralights.

Accidents and incidents

On May 5, 2018, an Aeronca 7AC crashed off Dolsontown Road, in the nearby town of Wawayanda shortly after taking off from Randall. The pilot, Rabbi Aaron D. Panken, president of Hebrew Union College-Jewish Institute of Religion, was killed; the other passenger, a flight instructor, survived with injuries that were not life-threatening.

See also

List of airports in New York

References

External links 
 Aerial photo as of 23 April 1994 from USGS The National Map via MSR Maps
 
 

Airports in New York (state)
Transportation buildings and structures in Orange County, New York